This is a list of constituencies of Hong Kong, there are currently ten geographical constituencies and 28 functional constituencies that elect 50 out of 90 members to the Legislative Council of Hong Kong.  The structure of both constituency categories has undergone major changes throughout their history.

Legislative Council

Geographical constituencies

Geographical constituencies (GC) were first introduced in Hong Kong's first legislative election with direct elections in 1991. The following table charts the evolution of geographical constituencies of the LegCo:

Functional constituencies

Functional constituencies (FC) were first introduced in Hong Kong's first legislative election in 1985. The following table charts the evolution of functional constituencies of the LegCo:

Electoral colleges

1985-1991
12 electoral colleges were established to return unofficial members of the Legislative Council in the 1985 and 1988 Legislative Council elections, composed of members of district boards and municipal councils:

 Hong Kong Island East
 Hong Kong Island West
 Kwun Tong
 Wong Tai Sin
 Kowloon City
 South Kowloon
 Sham Shui Po
 New Territories East
 New Territories West
 New Territories South
 Urban Council
 Regional Council

1995
In the 1995 Legislative Council election, 10 seats were returned through the Election Committee, composed of elected members of district boards.

1998–2004; 2021-present
In the 1998 and 2000 Legislative Council elections, 10 and 6 seats were returned through the Election Committee Constituency respectively. Most of the 800 Election Committee members were elected by voters who were eligible to vote in the functional constituencies. The Election Committee Constituency has been re-established since the 2021 election, returning 40 seats.

Municipal Councils

Urban Council

Regional Council

District Councils
 List of constituencies of Central and Western District Council
 List of constituencies of Wan Chai District Council
 List of constituencies of Eastern District Council
 List of constituencies of Southern District Council
 List of constituencies of Yau Tsim Mong District Council
 List of constituencies of Sham Shui Po District Council
 List of constituencies of Kowloon City District Council
 List of constituencies of Wong Tai Sin District Council
 List of constituencies of Kwun Tong District Council
 List of constituencies of Tsuen Wan District Council
 List of constituencies of Tuen Mun District Council
 List of constituencies of Yuen Long District Council
 List of constituencies of North District Council
 List of constituencies of Tai Po District Council
 List of constituencies of Sai Kung District Council
 List of constituencies of Sha Tin District Council
 List of constituencies of Kwai Tsing District Council
 List of constituencies of Islands District Council

See also
 Elections in Hong Kong
 Politics of Hong Kong

 
Constituencies
Hong Kong